Betty David (1938 – August 31, 2007) was a Native American fashion designer renowned for her handmade coats and leather goods.

David was born in Nespelem, Washington; she attended the University of Oregon and Marylhurst College. She was enrolled as a member of the Spokane Tribe of Indians, Wellpinit, Washington.

In the 1970s, she received a shearling coat as a gift and decided she could design a better one. She first began selling her hand-sewn coats decorated with painted designs in, in David's own words, "Northwest Coast Indian style," at the Santa Fe Art Market. She later sold her work at galleries in Spokane and New York City and received attention in major publications.

Her work was acquired by the Heard Museum in Phoenix, Arizona, the Mitchell Museum of the American Indian in Evanston, Illinois and the Smithsonian National Museum of the American Indian.

David described her designs as bridging the divide between nature and abstraction: "'I’m inspired by animals and parts of animals, but I’m not trying to make critters. They’re abstract ... It’s a new totem pole look.'"

References 

Indigenous women of the Americas
Indigenous artists of the Americas
American fashion designers
1938 births
2007 deaths
Marylhurst University alumni
American women fashion designers
20th-century American women artists
20th-century American people
21st-century American women
Indigenous fashion designers of the Americas
20th-century Native American women
20th-century Native Americans
21st-century Native American women
21st-century Native Americans